Amorpha nana (dwarf indigo, dwarf indigobush, dwarf false indigo, fragrant indigo-bush, fragrant false indigo, dwarf wild indigo) is a  tall perennial shrub in the Pea family (Fabaceae) which is native to North America.  It has vibrant green pinnate leaves and clusters of purple flowers.  The fruits are small pods.  Dwarf false indigo grows in dry prairies and rocky hillsides. Amorpha nana likes rocky and sandy soil.

Thomas Nuttall described this species for science in 1813.  The species name, nana, is the botanical Latin term for "dwarf".

References

nana
Flora of the United States
Plants described in 1813